57424 Caelumnoctu, provisional designation , is an Eoan asteroid from the outer regions of the asteroid belt, approximately 7 kilometers in diameter. It was discovered on 16 September 2001, by astronomers of the Lincoln Near-Earth Asteroid Research at Lincoln Laboratory's Experimental Test Site near Socorro, New Mexico. The asteroid was named for the BBC television programme The Sky at Night.

Orbit and classification 

Caelumnoctu is a member the Eos family, the largest asteroid family in the outer main belt consisting of nearly 10,000 asteroids.

It orbits the Sun at a distance of 2.7–3.3 AU once every 5 years and 3 months (1,933 days; semi-major axis of 3.04 AU). Its orbit has an eccentricity of 0.09 and an inclination of 10° with respect to the ecliptic.

Physical characteristics 

The body's spectral type is unknown. Its albedo, however, corresponds to the K-type asteroids of which the Eos family predominantly consists.

Diameter and albedo 

According to the survey carried out by the NEOWISE mission of NASA's Wide-field Infrared Survey Explorer, Caelumnoctu measures 6.876 kilometers in diameter and its surface has an albedo of 0.113.

Rotation period 

As of 2017, no rotational lightcurve of Caelumnoctu has been obtained from photometric observations. The body's rotation period, poles and shape remain unknown.

Naming 

This minor planet was named "Caelumnoctu" (Latin for The Sky at Night) in honour of the BBC television programme which celebrated its 50th anniversary in 2007. The number "57424" refers to the date of the first broadcast, 24 April 1957.

The official naming citation was published by the Minor Planet Center on 2 April 2007.

References

External links 
 Asteroid Lightcurve Database (LCDB), query form (info )
 Dictionary of Minor Planet Names, Google books
 Asteroids and comets rotation curves, CdR – Observatoire de Genève, Raoul Behrend
 Discovery Circumstances: Numbered Minor Planets (55001)-(60000) – Minor Planet Center
 

057424
057424
Named minor planets
20010916